Since 2020, efforts have been made by conservatives and others to challenge critical race theory (CRT) being taught in schools in the United States.

Following the 2020 protests of the murders of Ahmaud Arbery, George Floyd, and Breonna Taylor, school districts began to introduce additional curriculum and create diversity, equity, and inclusion (DEI)-positions to address "disparities stemming from race, economics, disabilities and other factors." These measures were met with criticism from conservatives, particularly those in the Republican Party. Critics have described these criticisms to be part of a cycle of backlash against what they view as progress towards racial equality and equity.

Outspoken critics of critical race theory include former U.S. president Donald Trump, conservative activist Christopher Rufo, various Republican officials, and conservative commentators on Fox News and right-wing talk radio shows. Movements have arisen from the controversy; in particular, the No Left Turn in Education movement, which has been described as one of the largest groups targeting school boards regarding critical race theory. In response to CRT being taught, dozens of states have introduced bills which limit what schools can teach regarding race, American history, politics, and gender.

Background
Critical race theory is a cross-disciplinary intellectual and social movement of civil-rights scholars and activists who seek to examine the intersection of race, society, and law in the United States and to challenge mainstream American liberal approaches to racial justice. Conservative activism and efforts to censor curricula has resulted in the introduction of legislation banning the teaching of critical race theory in schools in many states across the United States.

History
In an interview on Fox News in September 2020, Conservative activist Christopher Rufo strongly denounced critical race theory.  Rufo was invited to a series of meetings with President Donald Trump which resulted in President Trump's denouncing CRT in a September 17 speech. At the same time President Trump announced the formation of the 1776 Commission with former Mississippi Governor Phil Bryant as a member, to produce a report in response to The 1619 Project. On September 22, Trump signed Executive Order 13950 calling on a number of federal agencies to defund programs that referred to CRT and concepts such as white privilege. CRT was accused of being "racist", "un-American", and "divisive".

Right wing media outlets weaponized CRT in advance of the 2021 off-year and 2022 midterm elections, as did Republican candidates, such as Glenn Youngkin and Jason Miyares. Fox News promoted No Left Turn in Education, which was described by a June 15, 2021, NBC News report as "one of the largest groups targeting school boards" regarding critical race theory". The Media Matters article described No Left Turn in Education as one of the "leading groups fearmongering about the teaching of critical race theory in schools". The article said that the group and Elana Yaron Fishbein its founder, frequently "used toxic and bigoted rhetoric on social media and in right-wing media to downplay CRT". In his 2022 book, How to Raise an Antiracist, American radical activist Ibram X. Kendi, author of How to Be an Antiracist described how Fishbein created No Left Turn in Education in the summer of 2020. Fishbein had pulled her children out of Gladwyne Elementary School and sent the superintendent of Lower Merion School District (LMSD) an email on June 18, 2020, challenging the LMSD's decision to introduce additional lessons in "cultural proficiency" in the wake of the murder of George Floyd, and that as an unspecified number of non-white students were launching a campaign calling for "antiracist education", Fishbein "rejected the premise of antiracism, CRT, comprehensive sex education (CSE), and climate change". Her movement was relatively small initially, but was really launched when she began to be invited as a guest on the prime time Tucker Carlson show in September 2020. Fishbein describes the movement as a grassroots parental organization that uses veteran GOP activists' playbook to enact change on school boards.

On December 7, 2020, the conservative nonprofit American Legislative Exchange Council (ALEC), that works with state legislators to draft and share model acts, facilitated a workshop entitled "Against Critical Theory's Onslaught Reclaiming Education and the American Dream" with Chris Rufo as a featured guest and 31 state legislators in attendance. ALEC provides a forum for collaboration on model bills—helping state legislators draft legislation that other states can also modify and introduce as bills.

During the fall of 2020 and in 2021, Trump's messaging during the 2020 U.S. presidential election campaign and its aftermath included strong messaging against critical race theory. On January 19, 2021, the 1776 Project report Trump had commissioned was submitted in the form of a 41-page "national plan" for a "patriotic education" in rebuttal to the 1619 Project, the journalists who produced it, and to CRT. The 1776 Commission also criticized what they alleged as being CRT's theoretical underpinningsItalian Marxist Antonio Gramsci, Herbert Marcuse, and the Frankfurt School, identity politics, and Howard Zinn. In contrast, the Trump White House described the 1776 Commission report as the "definitive chronicle of the American founding, a powerful description of the effect the principles of the Declaration of Independence have had on this Nation's history, and a dispositive rebuttal of reckless "re-education" attempts that seek to reframe American history around the idea that the United States is not an exceptional country but an evil one." The Commission was dissolved on January 21 in an Executive Order signed by President Biden in his first day in office.

Conservative commentators on Fox News and right-wing talk radio shows were strongly critical of CRT. Media Matters reported that in June 2021, Fox News network mentioned "critical race theory" a record high of 901 times; in May they made 537 mentions; by July it was up to a total of over 1,900 times in the previous 3.5 months. CRT became a "flash point" for Republicans in the United States as part of the culture wars, according to a Washington Post article. Throughout 2021, several conservative think tanks and pressure groups, such as the Heritage Foundation, the Idaho Freedom Foundation, the American Legislative Exchange Council and organizations funded by the Koch brothers adopted opposition to critical race theory as a major theme. Republicans focused on banning CRT from being used in schools across the United States, outside of college electives. By mid-summer 2021 conservative groups were bringing the battle over CRT to school boards. In Texas, Southlake, Tarrant County Carroll High School a group of POC students vied to address alleged racism after reported incidents dating back to at least 2018, and helped form the Southlake Anti-Racism Coalition (SARC). Dissenting parents formed the Southlake Families PAC and fought against them, endorsing a mayoral candidate and candidates for the school board and the city council. The PAC endorsed candidates won with about 70% of the vote. When they voted down the "call for cultural awareness into the curriculum", the PAC wrote on Twitter, "Critical Race Theory ain't coming here. This is what happens when good people stand up and say, not in my town, not on my watch." On their website the PAC wrote, "CRT is a theoretical framework which views society as dominated by white supremacy and categorizes people as 'privileged' or 'oppressed' based on their skin color....It also teaches kids to hate America. Ask yourself who in their right mind would want this taught in public schools?"

In February 2021, William A. Jacobson, a blogger and law school professor at Cornell University launched the website CriticalRace.org, which became the go-to site where many CRT opponents get their information about CRT, according to a Forbes article.  Jacobson established conservative non-profit, Legal Insurrection Foundation, and its website "Legal Insurrection" in 2008. He added the CRT database to warn students away from CRT tenets and anti-racism initiatives by listing universities and colleges where administrators in senior positions "promote equity and/or make public statements about racism." It includes colleges and universities that offer courses and/or training on CRT, "anti-racism", or create race-related programs and centers, and includes schools that hire faculty whose research or methodologies include CRT and anti-racism. His database also provides content about K-12 schools in the United States that might be CRT-friendly. Critics of Jacobson assert that "CRT encourages the questioning of unchallenged assumptions about America's "foundations as a nation",  and calls for a deeper understanding of the "massive socio-economic differences" within the context of race", and that "CriticalRace.org portrays such questioning of America's foundations as "anti-American".

The Economist and Reuters have conducted polls on how much the general public understands CRT, a "once-obscure academic concept", and they found that most people are unfamiliar with CRT and misunderstand it. Those who support CRT promote the idea that it is an "intellectual tool set developed by legal scholars for examining systemic racism". CRT originated in legal studies and was intended for legal scholars and academics. The Economist, based on YouGov data from 2021, said that 50% of Americans thought they had a "good idea of what critical race theory was and most people thought it was bad for America. However, The Economist asserted that "the attitudes and beliefs of 70% of Americans actually "chime" with CRTthat racism is a significant social problem in the United States". The claim that CRT makes is that racism is "woven into the U.S. legal system and ingrained in its primary institutions", according to Reuters. Further, according to a survey conducted by The Economist, "a majority" of adult Americans believes that racism exists in the US Congress, in American legal structures, financial institutions, and in organizations and agencies, including the police force.

A Reuters 2021 national opinion survey found that 57% of American adults said that they were not familiar with CRT. Of those who did claim they were familiar with CRT claims, Reuters found that follow-up responses to specific questions about CRTs tenets, were informed by "misconceptions about critical race theory that have been largely circulating among conservative media outlets". When asked true-false questions about CRT history and teachings, only 5% of those who said they were familiar with CRT, could provide the correct answers.

State-level legislation 

From January 2021 through February 2022, 35 states had introduced 137 bills which limit what "schools can teach with regard to race, American history, politics, sexual orientation and gender identity". PEN America, an American nonprofit association of writers "dedicated to free speech" that is affiliated with the International Freedom of Expression Exchange has been monitoring this legislation. Jeffrey Sachs, who is tracking the legislation, said that the "recent flurry" of bills means that the classroom has become a "minefield" for educators who want to teach "slavery, Jim Crow laws or the Holocaust". An April 2022 article in Education Week said that 42 states had either introduced legislation or "taken other steps" to restrict "teaching critical race theory" and, "more broadly, limit how teachers can discuss racism and sexism in class."

The first state to ban CRT was Idaho when a bill was introduced in mid-April 2021, and signed by Governor Brad Little on May 4.
By May 2021, multiple state legislatures introduced bills restricting the teaching of critical race theory (CRT) in public schools. Bills were passed in 14 states, all of which had both Republican-majority legislatures and Republican governors. Several of these bills specifically mention "critical race theory" or single out the New York Times 1619 Project.

The Texas state legislature, which is predominantly Republican, banned teachers from using the New York Times's 1619 Project as part of coursework. The 1619 Project revisits the role of African Americans in American history by reframing the consequences of slavery in the United States. Texas House Bill 3979 which was authored by Senator Bryan Hughes (R-Mineola) and others, became law in December 2021 limiting the way in which Texas schools can teach about race and racism, as well as other issues. Under Bill 3979, this bill declares that teachers should avoid teaching the following concepts "(1) one race or sex is inherently superior to the other; (2) an individual is inherently racist, sexist or oppressive because of their own race or sex; (3) an individual should be treated unfairly because their race or sex; (4) members of certain groups should not disrespect individuals on the basis of race, sex, or religion; (5) an individual's morality is based on their race or sex; (6) an individual bears responsibility for actions committed in the past by people of the same race or sex; (7) an individual should be ashamed or guilty became of their race or sex; (8) meritocracy is racist or sexist." As well, teachers no longer have any obligation to undertake any training on how to deal with racism in the classroom. The list is based on the divisive concepts listed in Trump's September 28, 2020, Executive Order,

On June 10, 2021, the Florida Board of Education banned CRT out of concerns that the concept of racism embedded in CRT is one that continues to uphold white supremacy in American society and its legal systems. The board's vote, which was encouraged by governor Ron DeSantis, was unanimous.

In April 2022, when Republican Governor Brian Kemp signed bills banning CRT, he said that the state was protecting parents' fundamental rights to direct their children's education by preventing classrooms in Georgia from becoming "pawns to those who indoctrinate our kids with their partisan political agendas."

A number of state laws to ban CRT from being taught in state public schools, did not include the words "critical race theory," with the exception of the laws passed in Idaho, according to a July 2, 2021, Brookings Institute article.

Outside the United States
In countries outside of the United States, the teaching of critical race theory and white privilege is also controversial. In Australia, the conservative Coalition government supported a Senate motion by Pauline Hanson to ban the teaching of critical race theory in the Australian National Curriculum. The Senate motion occurred during a review of the Australian National Curriculum. The motion did not recognize that the curriculum document did not have a reference to Critical Race Theory. Such a pre-emptive move has been linked to transnational culture wars between the UK, US and Australia.

In the United Kingdom, educators were warned that teachers teaching white privilege would be breaking the law.

Critics of CRT
The most outspoken critics of CRT include Donald Trump, Chris Rufo, and Republican officials.

Chris Rufo,  a senior fellow at the Manhattan Institute, has been one of the most active critics of CRT, according to a June 2021 New Yorker article. It was through Rufo's appearance on Fox News that President Trump learned about CRT. Rufo participated in drafting the language of the executive order. He spoke at the December 7, 2020 American Legislative Exchange Council workshop on creating the model bill adapted by a number of state legislators. On March 15, 2021, Rufo tweeted that the "goal is to have the public read something crazy in the newspaper and immediately think "critical race theory." We have decodified the term and will recodify it to annex the entire range of cultural constructions that are unpopular with Americans." Rufo said that CRT is anti-American and it poses a  "an existential threat to the United States". He warned that it had "pervaded every aspect of the federal government" by 2021.

American cultural critic, James A. Lindsay, who was known mainly for his role in the grievance studies affair, published a book in February 2020 in which he deconstructed critical race theory. In his book, he published numerous extracts taken directly from the original authors and their texts on critical race theory as objective proof of CRT's flaws.

When the Republican Senator from Arkansas, Tom Cotton, introduced an amendment to the 2021 budget reconciliation package that would prohibit the use of federal funds in CRT promotion in Pre-K programs and K-12 schools in August 2021, it passed 50 to 49. Cotton's Stop CRT Act was introduced in July 2021. Rufo praised Cotton's actions, saying that the "fight against CRT ha[d] gone national" and Senator Cotton was "leading the way."

Jim Pillen won the Republican primary race for governor in the 2022 Nebraska gubernatorial election with an election campaign based on his opposition to critical race theory as well as his stance against abortion rights.

Anti-CRT school boards firings, suspensions and resignations
One of the first suspensions related to critical race theory took place on September 1, 2021, in Colleyville in Tarrant County. James Whitfield, who was the high school's first Black principal at Colleyville Heritage High School, was suspended for allegedly promoting CRTWhitfield repeatedly denied the allegation. Parents and dozens of teachers pleaded with school district's board of trustees to reinstate Whitfield, a popular principal. Students held walkouts to support the principal. In the summer of 2020, Whitfield wrote an open letter sharing his concerns over the murders of Ahmoud Arbery and George Floyd, and the killing of Breonna Taylor. In response, a former school board candidate, Stetson Clark, spoke up at July school board meeting to accuse Whitfield of promoting CRT. A few people attending the meeting called out, "Fire him."

According to the Dallas, Texas-based WFAA television, by February 2022, some Christian pastors were fighting back against what they call the "far-right playbook to take down Texas public schools" saying it is "sheer destructive chaos" that has resulted in an "obscure term called Critical Race Theory...consum[ing] parents who believe it is being taught in Texas classrooms." It has also resulted in the resignations of several school district superintendents, including in the Independent school district (ISD)s of Dallas and Fort Worth.

On June 16, 2022, ProPublica and Frontline published an article on how a group of vocal and organized anti-CRT white parents in the Cherokee County School District (CCSD) in Georgia, had targeted Cecelia Lewis, a Black educator, who had been offered a job in early 2021 as CCSD's first diversity, equity and inclusion (DEI)-focused administrative position. Some of the parents researched and targeted the educator and were successful in making her next job impossible, which led to her resignation.

See also

Anti-bias curriculum
Judicial aspects of race in the United States
Institutional or systemic racism
Racism in the United States
Slavery in the United States

Notes

Citations

References

A
 
 
 
 </ref>
B
 
 
 
 
  
C 
  
 
D
 
E
 
 
 
F
 
 
G
 
 
 
  
 
H
 
  
I
 
K 
 
 
 
 
 
L
 
 
 
M
 
 
 
 
N 
 
 
O
 
P
 
 
 
R
 
 
  
 
S
  
  
 
 
T
  
 
W
 
 
 
 
 * 
 

2020s controversies in the United States
 
Critical theory
Politics and race